Isaac Naylor & Sons Ltd v NZ Co-op Wool Marketing Assoc Ltd [1981] 1 NZLR 361 is a cited case in New Zealand regarding remoteness of loss for damages. This case reinforces the English case of The Herron II; Koufos v C Czarnikow Ltd [1969] 1 AC 350 into NZ case law.

References

Court of Appeal of New Zealand cases
New Zealand contract case law
1981 in New Zealand law
1981 in case law